"Without You" is a song by English boy band Blue. It was written by band members Lee Ryan, Duncan James, Antony Costa, and Simon Webbe along with Wayne Hector, Mich "Cutfather" Hansen, Jason Gill, and Daniel Davidsen and recorded for their fourth studio album, Roulette (2013). Production was helmed by Hansen, Gill, and Davidsen. "Without You" was released as the album's third single on 16 May in Austria, Germany, and Switzerland, where it reached the top 50 of the German and the Swiss Singles Chart.

Music video
A music video for "Without You" was directed by German filmmaker Lennart Brede. Filming took place in Los Angeles and was tracked by the eighth season of the German reality television series Germany's Next Topmodel during which contestants Anna-Maria Damm, Marie Czuczman, Maike van Grieken, and Sabrina Elsner were picked by Blue to appear alongside them in the video.

Track listing

Notes
  signifies an additional producer

Credits and personnel
Adapted from the liner notes of Roulette.

 Sascha Bühren – mastering
 Cutfather – songwriting, production, percussion
 Anthony Costa – songwriting
 Daniel Davidsen – songwriting, production, drums, guitar, instruments, programming
 Jason Gill – songwriting, production, drums, instrumentation, programming

 Wayne Hector – songwriting
 Duncan James – songwriting
 Mads Nilsson – mixing
 Lee Ryan – songwriting
 Simon Webbe – songwriting

Charts

Release history

References

2013 singles
2013 songs
Blue (English band) songs
Songs written by Antony Costa
Songs written by Cutfather
Songs written by Daniel Davidsen
Songs written by Duncan James
Songs written by Jason Gill (musician)
Songs written by Lee Ryan
Songs written by Simon Webbe
Songs written by Wayne Hector
Island Records singles